The 1995 Porsche Tennis Grand Prix was a women's tennis tournament played on indoor hard courts at the Filderstadt Tennis Centre in Filderstadt, Germany and was part of the Tier II of the 1995 WTA Tour. It was the 18th edition of the tournament and was held from 9 October to 15 October 1995. Seventh-seeded  Iva Majoli won the singles title and earned $79,000 first-prize money as well as 300 ranking points.

Finals

Singles

 Iva Majoli defeated   Gabriela Sabatini 6–4, 7–6(7–4)
 It was Majoli's 2nd singles title of the year and of her career.

Doubles

 Gigi Fernández /  Natasha Zvereva defeated  Meredith McGrath /  Larisa Savchenko 5–7, 6–1, 6–4

Prize money

References

External links
 Official website 
 ITF tournament edition details
 Tournament draws

Porsche Tennis Grand Prix
Porsche Tennis Grand Prix
1995 in German women's sport
1990s in Baden-Württemberg
German